The Development of Metaphysics in Persia is the book form of Muhammad Iqbal's PhD thesis in philosophy at the University of Munich submitted in 1908 and published in the same year. It traces the development of metaphysics in Persia from the time of Zoroaster to the advent of the Baháʼí Faith.

Introduction
Muhammad Iqbal had gone to Germany and enrolled into Ludwig Maximilian University, Munich where he earned a PhD Degree by submitting The Development of Metaphysics in Persia as his final thesis, in 1908. Iqbal's doctoral supervisor was Fritz Hommel. The book published by Luzac & Company, London same year. Iqbal covers in this book from Zoroaster to Bahá'u'lláh era and metaphysical anatomy. This is one of the masterpieces of Muhammad Iqbal's research work. No such research had been done before or since in the English Language on the topic.

Quotes from the Book
"Owing to my ignorance of Zend, my knowledge of Zoroaster is merely second hand. As regards the second part of my work, I have been able to look up the original Persian and Arabic manuscripts as well as many printed works connected with my investigation. 
 utilized here. The method of transliteration adopted is the one recognised by the Royal Asiatic Society"

Editions
First Edition of the book published by Luzac & Company, London in 1908. After that Bazm e Iqbal published it from Lahore in 1954. The book has been translated into many international languages including Persian, Urdu and Bosnian.

See also 
 Index of Muhammad Iqbal–related articles

References

Further reading
 Walbridge, John. Allamah Iqbal’s First Book. A Lecture at Lahore College for Women on the Occasion of Iqbal Day, 2000.

External links 
Development of Metaphysics in Persia, Iqbal Academy Pakistan 
Development of Metaphysics in Persia, Iqbal Cyber Library 
Development of Metaphysics in Persia, complete text of the work (PDF format).

1908 non-fiction books
Books by Muhammad Iqbal
Metaphysics books